Waterson Point State Park is a  state park located on Wellesley Island in the St. Lawrence River in the Town of Orleans in Jefferson County, New York. It is near Wellesley Island State Park.

The park was established in 1898 as part of the St. Lawrence Reservation.

Description
Waterson Point State Park is a small boater's park in the Thousand Islands. It offers dockage for 30 boats, fishing, and picnic tables. The park is accessible only by boat.

See also
 List of New York state parks

References

External links
 New York State Parks: Waterson Point State Park

State parks of New York (state)
Parks in Jefferson County, New York